Kelly Oechsli (23 February 1918 – 18 October 1999) was an American illustrator (and occasionally author) of children's books. He illustrated Sesame Street and Fraggle Rock books, as well as children's encyclopediae such as the young children's encyclopedia .

Books
Oechsli has been a part of a number of books which include:
 The Haunting of Grade Three by Grace Maccarone, Kelly Oechsli (Illustrator)
 Scruffy by Peggy Parish, Kelly Oechsli (Illustrations)
 The Sesame Street Storybook by Jeff Moss, Jon Stone, Norman Stiles, Mel Crawford (Illustrator)
 Weeny Witch by Ida DeLage, Kelly Oechsli (Illustrator)
 A House for Little Red (Modern Curriculum Press Beginning to Read Series) by Margaret Hillert, Kelly Oechsli (Illustrator)
 Mice at Bat by Kelly Oechsli
 The Dragon In The Clock Box by M. Jean Craig, Kelly Oechsli (Illustrator)
 The Birthday Car by Margaret Hillert, Kelly Oechsli (Illustrator)
 In My Garden: A Child's Gardening Book by Helen Oechsli, Kelly Oechsli
 Benny, Benny, Baseball Nut by David A. Adler, Kelly Oechsli (Illustrator)
 The Haunted House by Dorothy Rose, Kelly Oechsli (Illustrator)
 Humpty Dumpty's Holiday Stories by Kelly Oechsli
 Red and the Pumpkins by Jocelyn Stevenson, Kelly Oechsli (Illustrator)
 If I Could, I Would by David R. Collins, Kelly Oechsli
 Too Many Monkeys!: A Counting Rhyme by Kelly Oechsli
 Gobbledy-Gook by Steven Kroll, Kelly Oechsli (Illustrator)
 Playtime In The City by Leland Blair Jacobs, Kelly Oechsli (Illustrator)
 The Monkey's ABC Word Book by Kelly Oechsli
 Space Dog in Trouble by Natalie Standiford (Goodreads Author), Kelly Oechsli (Illustrator)
 Jack Frost and the Magic Paint Brush by Kathy Darling, Kelly Oechsli
 One-Minute Stories of Brothers and Sisters by Shari Lewis, Kelly Oechsli (Illustrator)
 Home Sweet Home by Kelly Oechsli
 Monkey And The Bee by Kelly Oechsli (Illustrator)
 The Monkey And The Bee by Leland Jacobs, Kelly Oechsli (Illustrator)
 Arithmetic in Verse and Rhyme by Allan D Jacobs, Leland B. Jacobs, Kelly Oechsli (Illustrator)
 Humpty Dumpty's Bedtime Stories by Kelly Oechsli
 The Easter Bunny's Secret by Kathy Darling, Kelly Oechsli
 I Wish That I Could Have a Pet by Dorothy Rose, Kelly Oechsli (Illustrator)
 ABC Pigs Go to Market by Ida DeLage, Kelly Oechsli
 Christmas in Britain and Scandinavia by Lillie Patterson, Kelly Oechsli (Illustrator)
 GERMS MAKE ME SICK by Parnell Donahue, Helen Capellaro, Kelly Oechsli (Illustrator)
 Space Dog the Hero by Natalie Standiford (Goodreads Author), Kathleen C. Howell (Illustrator), Kelly Oechsli (Illustrator)
 Peter Bull by Helen Oechsli, Kelly Oechsli
 Everything Changes by Morris H. Philipson, Kelly Oechsli
 Christmas Trick or Treat by Lillie Patterson, Kelly Oechsli
 School by Ellen Rudin, Kelly Oechsli
 Fly Away! by Helen Oechsli, Kelly Oechsli
 Walter the Wolf by Marjorie Weinman Sharmat, Kelly Oechsli
 Hunting of the Snark by Lewis Carroll, Kelly Oechsli
 Peaky Beaky, by Bertrand de Vogüé, Kelly Oechsli

References

External links
 http://www.jacketflap.com/persondetail.asp?person=87833
  from 1962

1918 births
1999 deaths
American children's writers
American children's book illustrators